Malta Music Awards (MMA) is an annual music awards ceremony held since October 20, 1995 and organised by Mega Music Malta in collaboration with Public Broadcasting Services and Magic Malta. The aims of the Malta Music Awards include promotion of local artists and awarding their achievements during the previous year, honouring artists for their contributions towards local music throughout their life-long careers, encouraging new talent, promoting of Maltese music, helping artists to better their standards, honouring Maltese artists for achieving international success, supporting local talent generally, showcasing local talent to help its growth and achieving international success, and increasing the public's interest in the local music industry.

Notable local singers, bands, authors, and composers who have won awards at these ceremonies include Chiara, Debbie Scerri, Emma Muscat, Fabrizio Faniello, Freddie Portelli, Ira Losco,  Mary Spiteri, Olivia Lewis, Philip Vella, Red Electric, The Travellers, and Winter Moods.

Categories 
Award categories of the Malta Music Awards have changed over the years and have included:

Ceremonies

Malta Music Awards 1995 
The first edition of the Malta Music Award was held on October 20, 1995 at the Mediterranean Conference Centre.

Malta Music Awards 1996

Malta Music Awards 1997 
The 1997 Malta Music Awards were held at the Mediterranean Conference Centre.

Malta Music Awards 1998 
The 1998 Malta Music Awards were held at the Mediterranean Conference Centre on the 23rd of October.

Malta Music Awards 1999 

The Malta Music Awards 1999 were held at the Mediterranean Conference Centre.

Malta Music Awards 2001 
The Malta Music Awards 2001 were held on October 20th at the Mediterranean Conference Centre.

Malta Music Awards 2003 
The 2003 edition of the Malta Music Awards was held on October 20th at the Mediterranean Conference Centre.

Malta Music Awards 2007 
The Malta Music Awards 2007 were held on October 20 at the Mediterranean Conference Centre.

Malta Music Awards 2008 
The Malta Music Awards 2008 were held on October 20 at the Mediterranean Conference Centre.

Malta Music Awards 2009 
The 2009 edition of the Malta Music Awards was held at the Malta Fairs & Conventions Centre on December 5.

Malta Music Awards 2010 
The Malta Music Awards of 2010 were held on November 27 at the Malta Fairs & Conventions Centre. This edition marked 15 years since the first edition of the Awards.

Malta Music Awards 2011 
The 2011 Malta Music Awards were held on November 26 at the Malta Fairs & Conventions Centre.

Malta Music Awards 2012 

The 2012 edition of the Awards was planned for November 24 at the Malta Fairs & Conventions Centre in Ta’ Qali.

Malta Music Awards 2013 
This edition of the MMA was held at the Malta Fairs & Conventions Centre on February 3.

Malta Music Awards 2014 
The 2014 ceremony was held at the Malta Fairs & Conventions Centre on the 9th of February.

Malta Music Awards 2020 
The 2020 edition of the Malta Music Awards marked twenty five years of award shows. The ceremony was held at The Malta Fairs & Conventions Centre on 7th March 2020.

Maltese music
Music festivals in Malta

References

See also 
Music of Malta

Awards established in 1995
Music awards
Music awards by country
European music awards
Maltese awards